The Runner may refer to:

Films and television
 The Runner, a 1972 film featuring Delvene Delaney
 The Runner (1985 film), an Iranian drama film
 The Runner (1999 film), a crime thriller film
 The Runner, a 2013 documentary about Salah Ameidan
 The Runner (2015 film), an American political thriller film
 The Runner (TV series), a U.S. reality series on go90
 The Runner, a 2021 film directed by Michelle Danner

Other uses
 The Runner, a 1970s running magazine merged with Runner's World
 The Runner (song), a 2019 single by British band Foals
 "Runner" (song) or "The Runner", a 1984 single by Manfred Mann's Earth Band
 The Runner, a 1985 book by Cynthia Voigt

See also
 Runner (disambiguation)
 The Runners (disambiguation)